South Korea competed at the 2022 World Aquatics Championships in Budapest, Hungary from 18 June to 3 July.

Medalists

Artistic swimming 

South Korea entered 3 artistic swimmers.

Women

Diving

South Korea entered 5 divers.

Men

Women

Mixed

Open water swimming

South Korea entered 8 open water swimmers (4 male and 4 female )

Men

Women

Mixed

Swimming

South Korea entered 22 swimmers.
Men

Women

Mixe

References

Nations at the 2022 World Aquatics Championships
2022
World Aquatics Championships